Choi Tu-son was a South Korean politician who served as 7th Prime Minister of South Korea from 17 December 1963 to 9 May 1964.

References

South Korean politicians